Mark Simon Harrison (born 11 December 1960) is an English professional football manager and former player who is now the technical director at Super League of Malawi club Mighty Wanderers.

He kept goal in the English Football League for Port Vale and Stoke City, and also played non-league football for Hellenic, Kettering Town, Stafford Rangers, and Telford United. He managed Stafford Rangers for a brief spell and then from 2000 he began coaching clubs and nations in Asia and Africa, including the Bangladesh national team, Fortune, Hurriya, Mpumalanga Black Aces, African Warriors, Bay Stars, Chippa United, Golden Arrows, CAPS United, and Township Rollers. In the 2015–16 season he led Township Rollers to the Botswana Premier League title and the final of the Mascom Top 8 Cup, before he was appointed technical director at South African side Baroka in January 2017. In July 2017, he joined the Zimbabwean Premier Soccer League team Harare City as technical director, and was promoted to manager a year later. He was appointed as head coach of Highlanders in January 2020. In August 2021, he was appointed as manager at Kenyan Premier League team Gor Mahia. He was appointed as technical director at Malawi's Mighty Wanderers in September 2022.

Playing career
Harrison was a trainee with Southampton, before joining John McGrath's Fourth Division side Port Vale in February 1980. He was immediately the first choice keeper for the "Valiants", however was troubled by cartilage problems from November 1980. In the summer of 1981 he was loaned to rivals Stoke City as they played a youth tournament. After returning to Vale Park he was an ever-present for the 46 game 1981–82 season. He was sold to City, along with Mark Chamberlain, for a combined fee of £180,000 in August 1982. He left Victoria Ground in 1984 due to long-term injury problems.

After he left the "Potters", he not only left Stoke-on-Trent but England as well, as he switched to South African side Hellenic. He later returned to England to play non-league football with Kettering Town, Stafford Rangers and Telford United. Harrison later returned to South Africa to play for Hellenic for a second time.

Management career
Upon his retirement, he returned to England and became the youth coach of Bristol City, then goalkeeper coach of Everton, before becoming coach and assistant manager of Barrow, later player-manager of Stafford Rangers and then the reserve coach and assistant manager of Oxford United. Harrison gained his UEFA A licence at the age of 33.

He later had a spell as coach of the Bangladesh national football team. He then went on to manage Fortune in the South African NFD and later Hurriya in the Maldives. He was also employed to assist Mpumalanga Black Aces in the South African Premier Soccer League in 2011. He was promoted to head coach for the remainder of the 2010–11 season, but departed the club at the end of the campaign. He went on to coach African Warriors in the National First Division. Harrison took up the job as head coach of Bay Stars, in South Africa's third tier, the SAFA Second Division for the 2012–13 season. However, he left during the season to join Chippa United.

Harrison was appointed head coach of Chippa United in April 2013 but despite not losing a game, was unable to prevent the team from being relegated at the end of the 2012–13 season. He resigned from his position after four games in 2013–14 season and became head coach of Golden Arrows on 7 October 2013. In January 2015 he was appointed head coach of Zimbabwean club CAPS United. Harrison resigned on 16 June 2015. On the same day, he was announced as the head coach of Botswana Premier League side Township Rollers. He led the Rollers to the league title in controversial circumstances 2015–16, as the Botswana Football Association deducted the club ten points for fielding an ineligible player before the ruling was overturned on appeal. They also reached the final of the Mascom Top 8 Cup, where they lost 3–1 to Orapa United.

Harrison left Township Rollers, after 18 months in charge, and decided that it was time to make the move to South Africa, bemoaning people in Botswana that "really make it hard to do things". He subsequently became the new technical director at Baroka, his 11th different club in six years working in African football. In July 2017, he joined the Zimbabwe Premier Soccer League team Harare City as technical director. Harare won the Cup of Zimbabwe in 2017 with a 3–1 victory over How Mine. In 2018, he became the manager of the club and was joined by his son Ryan Harrison, who joined the club as a goalkeeper. On 8 January 2020, he was appointed as head coach of Zimbabwe Premier Soccer League rivals Highlanders on a two-year contract.

On 1 August 2021, Harrison was appointed as manager at Kenyan Premier League team Gor Mahia. He attempted to instill an attacking style of play into the team. However, he was sacked on 29 January 2022. On 27 September 2022, Harrison was appointed as technical director at Super League of Malawi club Mighty Wanderers on a two-year contract; the club were 15 points behind league leaders Nyasa Big Bullets at the time of his appointment.

Personal life
He dated broadcaster and television presenter Fiona Phillips in the 1980s.

Career statistics
Source:

Honours
Township Rollers
Botswana Premier League: 2015–16
Mascom Top 8 Cup runner-up: 2016

References

External links

Footballers from Derby
English footballers
Association football goalkeepers
Southampton F.C. players
Port Vale F.C. players
Stoke City F.C. players
English expatriate footballers
English expatriate sportspeople in South Africa
Expatriate soccer players in South Africa
Hellenic F.C. players
Kettering Town F.C. players
Stafford Rangers F.C. players
Telford United F.C. players
English Football League players
National League (English football) players
English football managers
Stafford Rangers F.C. managers
English expatriate football managers
English expatriate sportspeople in Bangladesh
Bangladesh national football team managers
Expatriate football managers in Zimbabwe
CAPS United F.C. managers
Expatriate football managers in Botswana
Expatriate soccer managers in South Africa
Highlanders F.C. managers
Expatriate football managers in Kenya
Gor Mahia F.C. managers
Expatriate football managers in Malawi
National League (English football) managers
Association football coaches
Association football goalkeeping coaches
Bristol City F.C. non-playing staff
Everton F.C. non-playing staff
Oxford United F.C. non-playing staff
1960 births
Living people